Lake Predil is a lake near Cave del Predil, part of the Tarvisio municipality in the Province of Udine, in the Italian region of Friuli-Venezia Giulia.

Geography
In the east, the Predil  Pass road leads up to the Slovenian border.

Due to its picturesque setting beneath the Kanin massif, the lake is a popular tourist destination for hikers and day trippers.

History
For centuries, the southern border of the Imperial Duchy of Carinthia with the Venetian Domini di Terraferma ran along the nearby mountain crests of Predil Pass and Sella Nevea. After the loss of the Venetian territory to the Kingdom of Italy in 1866, the Austro-Hungarian Army from 1885 to 1887 had a fortress erected on the lakeside, to protect the road down to Tarvisio.

In World War I, the fort was badly damaged during the Battles of the Isonzo on the Italian Front. Some ruins are preserved and accessible to the public.

External links

Lakes of Friuli-Venezia Giulia
Lakes of the Julian Alps